Adaku Okoroafor  (born 18 November 1974) is a Nigerian footballer who played as a forward for the Nigeria women's national football team. She was part of the team at the inaugural 1991 FIFA Women's World Cup as well as the 1995 FIFA Women's World Cup.

References

External links
 

1974 births
Living people
Nigerian women's footballers
Nigeria women's international footballers
Place of birth missing (living people)
1995 FIFA Women's World Cup players
Women's association football forwards
1991 FIFA Women's World Cup players
Igbo people